The Riviera Country Club is a private club with a championship golf course and tennis courts in the Pacific Palisades neighborhood of the Westside of Los Angeles, California.

The Riviera was designed by golf course architects George C. Thomas Jr. and William P. Bell, it has been the primary host for the Genesis Invitational (originally the Los Angeles Open), an annual event on the PGA Tour in February. The 2021 edition was the 58th held at Riviera.

The Riviera has hosted three major championships: the U.S. Open in 1948, and the PGA Championship in 1983 and 1995. In addition, it was site of the U.S. Senior Open, a senior major, in 1998 and the U.S. Amateur in August 2017. The club is scheduled to host the 2026 U.S. Women's Open. The club is also scheduled to host the Olympics in 2028.

History
When the country club and course opened  in 1926, it was known as the Los Angeles Athletic Club Golf Course. William P. Bell helped Thomas in the design and planning of the course. They were in charge of assembling a labor force to build the course from scratch in the Santa Monica Canyon. The entire country club and golf course cost $243,827 to build; at the time, it was one of the most expensive in golf history. The course has been modified a few times, most notably in 1992 when Ben Crenshaw and Bill Coore redesigned the bunkers to look as they did when the course opened.

The country club prospered in the 1930s; it hosted the dressage equestrian and the riding part of the modern pentathlon events for the 1932 Summer Olympics. The Riviera Equestrian Center was where prominent riders like Egan Merz trained younger people like Elizabeth Taylor how to ride; Taylor, then a child star, was preparing for her role in the 1944 movie National Velvet.

According to a story told about Randy Newman, in the early 1950s, the club did not even allow Jews on the premises.

The 1952 movie Pat and Mike, starring Katharine Hepburn and Babe Zaharias, was filmed at Riviera, as was The Caddy, starring Jerry Lewis and Dean Martin, with a cameo appearance by Ben Hogan, and Follow the Sun, about Hogan, starring Glenn Ford and Anne Baxter. During the silent era, the 1927 movie Spring Fever was filmed at the new club, in which it was called Oakmont Country Club.

Riviera has had many famous members, which included Humphrey Bogart, Glen Campbell, Vic Damone, Peter Falk, Jack Ging, Dean Martin, Gregory Peck, Walt Disney, Hal Roach, Douglas Fairbanks, and Mary Pickford. The actor Conrad Veidt died suddenly of a heart attack in 1943 while playing golf at the club.

Willie Hunter, the 1921 British Amateur champion and six-time PGA Tour winner, served as the head professional from 1936 to 1964. His son, Mac Hunter, was head pro from 1964 to 1973. Willie Hunter helped save the course from severe flooding in 1939, and helped rescue the club from bankruptcy during World War II.

PGA Tour
Riviera hosted the Los Angeles Open in 1929 and 1930, then nine consecutive years from 1945 through 1953. It returned  where it has remained, with the exception of 1983 and 1998, for a total of 75 times through 2020.

The course is well known for Ben Hogan, and the course has been called "Hogan's Alley" (a moniker shared with Colonial Country Club in Texas). Hogan won the L.A. Open three times (1942, 1947, 1948), finished second once (1946), and won the U.S. Open in 1948; all were at Riviera except the 1942 event (at Hillcrest). Other notable winners at Riviera include Sam Snead, Byron Nelson, Hale Irwin, Tom Watson, Johnny Miller, Ben Crenshaw, Bubba Watson, Mark Calcavecchia, Fred Couples, Corey Pavin, Craig Stadler, Nick Faldo, Ernie Els, Mike Weir, and Phil Mickelson. Hal Sutton won the PGA Championship in August 1983, and Steve Elkington in 1995. More than 22 years after his win in 1976, Irwin won the U.S. Senior Open at Riviera in July 1998.

More recent winners at Riviera include Rory Sabbatini in 2006, and Charles Howell III, who won in 2007 in a sudden-death playoff against Phil Mickelson. In 2008, the first as the Northern Trust Open, Mickelson hung on for a two-shot win over Jeff Quinney to win for the first time at Riviera. This win gave Mickelson at least one win in every West Coast Swing event. Australian Adam Scott ended a near four-year title drought on the US PGA Tour after beginning the final round of the event in a share of the lead and a Sunday 70 gave him an 11-under-par (273) total to win the Genesis Open in 2020 just prior to the Tour shutting down due to the COVID-19 pandemic.

Notable exceptions to the list of winners are Jack Nicklaus and Tiger Woods. Nicklaus' best finish in the L.A. Open was at age 38 in 1978, two strokes back as solo runner-up after an uncharacteristic stumble, relinquishing the lead late in the final round. Five years later at the PGA Championship, he was one stroke behind champion Sutton.

As a high school sophomore from Cypress in neighboring Orange County, Woods played his very first PGA Tour event, on a sponsor's exemption (as an amateur) at Riviera in 1992; he shot 72–75 and missed the cut by six strokes. His best finish at L.A. was in 1998, when the Nissan Open was held at the Valencia Country Club (Riviera was being prepared for the U.S. Senior Open). Woods shot 65–66 on the weekend, but lost in a playoff to Billy Mayfair, one of only two playoff losses on tour (15–2 through February 2014). Woods finished tied for second in 1999 and had top-10 finishes in 2003 and 2004. The 2005 event had only two rounds due to rain; Woods finished 13th. He played at Riviera in 2006, also rain-plagued, but withdrew after two rounds due to illness, missed the next eleven editions, then returned in 2018

Major championships held at Riviera

Bolded years are major championships on the PGA Tour.

General information
The greens at Riviera are Poa annua, common for the West, but the fairways and rough are Kikuyu grass. A tough, dense pasture grass originally from East Africa, it had been used at a nearby polo field in the 1930s and was also planted on hillsides to prevent erosion. Over the years, it gradually invaded the course and became the dominant species. Kikuyu provides optimal lies on close-mown fairways, but is very challenging in the spongy rough.

Guests at Riviera must play the course with a member. For the dress code, denim is not allowed; a collared shirt and either Bermuda shorts or slacks are required.

The course
The men's slope ratings are 74.6/135 and 72.2/130 for the back and middle tees, respectively. The ladies' slope rating is 74.3/142 for the forward tees.

The course record for competitive play is 61, ten under par, shot by Ted Tryba in 1999 in the third round of the Nissan Open, and included a bogey on 18. Tryba was the runner-up that year to Ernie Els. The course record for the lowest nine holes is 28 (seven under par on the front nine), shot by Andrew Magee in the opening round in 1991 (followed by a 38 on the back nine for a 66). He finished the tournament four strokes back, tied for eighth.

Front nine

The first hole, a short par five, is a relatively easy beginning hole. Scores range from eagle to double bogey. The second hole is a long par-four that plays uphill and into the wind, and is the number one handicap hole. The third is medium-length and also plays into a breeze.

The fourth hole is rather long, which Hogan called the "best par three in America," while the fifth plays into the wind and is almost on the side of the hill. The par-three sixth hole is world-famous for the bunker in the middle of the green. If a player is on the wrong side of the green, they will have to make a tough decision to either putt around or chip over the bunker.

The last three holes of the front are all par-four. The narrow fairway at the seventh is difficult to hit, and the long eighth hole has two fairways separated by a dry ditch. The ninth, long and uphill, is known for its well-placed fairway bunkers.

Back nine
The tenth hole is a very short,  par four known as a risk-reward hole. Longer hitters can try to drive the green from the tee, but accuracy is a priority, as several bunkers surround the green. The eleventh is a long par-five where eucalyptus trees and a barranca come into play. The twelfth is a long par-four, often into the wind, that plays to a narrow green surrounded by the barranca, bunkers, and trees; Bogey's Tree is named after actor Humphrey Bogart.

The thirteenth is a tough driving hole, with the barranca on the left side and eucalyptus along the right. The fourteenth is an easy par-three with Riviera's largest green, but it is multi-tiered, which makes putting difficult. The fifteenth hole is a dogleg par-four to the right that features another large green; it's two-tiered, so the ball needs to be on the proper level. This hole plays into the breeze of the Pacific Ocean, slightly over a mile (1.6 km) away, and is often pivotal in determining a champion.

The sixteenth is the last par-three hole and can yield birdies, however players will need to hit the small green that is surrounded by bunkers. The seventeenth hole, Riviera's longest, heads uphill, downwind, and northeast towards the clubhouse, while the eighteenth is a world-famous finishing hole. Its uphill tee shot is blind and finding the fairway is crucial to reach the green in regulation, which is surrounded by a natural amphitheater with a beautiful view of the clubhouse.

Scorecard

References

External links

Official PGA Tour website for the Northern Trust Open
Golf Course Histories aerial comparison 1927 v 2013

Golf clubs and courses in Los Angeles
Landmarks in Los Angeles
Pacific Palisades, Los Angeles
Clubs and societies in the United States
Olympic equestrian venues
Olympic modern pentathlon venues
Olympic golf venues
Venues of the 1932 Summer Olympics
Venues of the 2028 Summer Olympics
1926 establishments in California
Sports organizations established in 1926